Abdollah Ramezanzadeh is an Iranian academic, writer and politician.

An ethnic Kurdish, he is the former spokesman and secretary of the government of the Islamic Republic of Iran during the presidency of Muhammad Khatami.

Ramezanzadeh is an assistant professor in faculty of Law and Political Science of University of Tehran, and a member of Islamic Iran Participation Front. He was the governor of the Kurdistan Province of Iran from 1997 to 2001.

In 1996, Ramezanzadeh got his PhD from Katholieke Universiteit Leuven, Belgium. His thesis entitles "Internal and international dynamics of ethnic conflict: the case of Iran".

Arrest
Ramezanzadeh was arrested a few hours after the 2009 disputed presidential election. Shortly before his arrest, Ramezanzadeh released a historic speech posted on the opposition web sites and distributed throughout Iran and all over the world. He was in solitary confinement for 4 months and sentenced to 6 years jail. He is among the Iranian activists for the ethnic groups rights and the head of the Iranian Kurdish Reformists.

References

External links 
 Ramezanzadeh is facing trial in Iran (BBC Persian)

Spokespersons of the Government of Iran
Iranian governors
Iranian democracy activists
Living people
1954 births
KU Leuven alumni
Islamic Iran Participation Front politicians
Academic staff of the Islamic Azad University, Central Tehran Branch
Imam Sadiq University alumni